The Umatilla Masonic Lodge Hall is a Masonic building in Echo, Oregon. It is one of the oldest edifices in Umatilla County and is listed on the National Register of Historic Places. The hall was built in Umatilla City in 1868 and disassembled and moved by railroad to its present location in Echo in 1901, after Umatilla City declined economically due in part to railroad development.  It was deemed significant for association with development of rail transportation in Echo and Meadows area.  And it was deemed significant as "an excellent example of an Italianate False Front style building".

It was listed on the National Register of Historic Places in 1997.

See also
National Register of Historic Places listings in Umatilla County, Oregon

Notes

References

External links

Clubhouses on the National Register of Historic Places in Oregon
Italianate architecture in Oregon
Masonic buildings completed in 1901
Buildings and structures in Umatilla County, Oregon
Masonic buildings in Oregon
National Register of Historic Places in Umatilla County, Oregon
1901 establishments in Oregon
Echo, Oregon